Daniel Cristian Martin (born 5 October 2000) is a Romanian competitive swimmer, who specialized in backstroke events. He collected a total of seven medals in a junior international tournament, spanning the Youth Olympic Games, the World Championships, the European Championships, and the European Youth Olympic Festival. Additionally, Martin posted his own personal best of 53.52 to force a two-way tie for a golden finish and a meet record with Russia's Kliment Kolesnikov at the 2018 European Junior Swimming Championships in Helsinki, Finland. Martin currently trains as a member of the aquatics squad at the municipal sports club in his native Bacău, under the tutelage of his personal coach Iulian Matei.

Martin launched into the global scene as a junior swimmer at the 2018 Summer Youth Olympics in Buenos Aires, Argentina. There, he flipped with an early lead at the initial length of the men's 100 m backstroke final, before fading to a runner-up finish in 53.59, more than three tenths of a second behind Kolesnikov. Four days later, Martin continued to stage his rivalry with Kolesnikov for gold in the men's 200 m backstroke final, but could not catch him near the wall to finish again with a silver in his personal best of 1:58.20.

References

2000 births
Living people
Romanian male backstroke swimmers
Swimmers at the 2018 Summer Youth Olympics
Swimmers at the 2020 Summer Olympics
Sportspeople from Bucharest
Olympic swimmers of Romania